Joseph Gail O'Brien (November 14, 1911 – July 7, 1978) was an American football tackle in the National Football League (NFL) for the Boston Redskins.  He played college football at the University of Nebraska.  After retiring from professional football, O'Brien became the offensive line coach at Loyola University of Los Angeles—now known as Loyola Marymount University—in 1946, under head coach Tony DeLellis.

References

External links
 

1911 births
1978 deaths
American football tackles
Boston Redskins players
Loyola Lions football coaches
Nebraska Cornhuskers football players
Sportspeople from Cheyenne, Wyoming
Sportspeople from Omaha, Nebraska
Players of American football from Nebraska